Events from the 1270s in England.

Incumbents
Monarch – Henry III (to 16 November 1272), Edward I

Events
 1270
 April – Parliament levies a property tax to support the Eighth Crusade.
 9 September – William Chillenden elected to the Archbishopric of Canterbury.
 20 August – Prince Edward sets out on Lord Edward's crusade (the Ninth) with his wife Eleanor of Castile.
 Edmund, Earl of Cornwall, donates to the Cistercian Hailes Abbey near Winchcombe in Gloucestershire (his father's foundation) a phial held to contain the Blood of Christ, acquired in the Holy Roman Empire; this becomes such a magnet for pilgrimage that within 7 years the monks are able to rebuild their abbey on a magnificent scale.
 Battle of Áth-an-Chip: The army of the Irish Kingdom of Connacht routs the English army near Carrick-on-Shannon.
 1271
 9 May – Prince Edward arrives in Acre, starting Lord Edward's crusade (the Ninth) against Mamluk sultan Baibars.
 1272
 12 May – Lord Edward's crusade is concluded by the Treaty of Caesarea.
 June – an attempt is made on the life of Prince Edward at Acre; he kills the would-be assassin but receives a festering wound from a poisoned dagger.
 Summer – Pope Gregory X sets aside the election of William Chilldenden to the Archbishopric of Canterbury.
 24 September – Prince Edward leaves Acre for Sicily.
 11 October – Robert Kilwardby enthroned as Archbishop of Canterbury.
 16 November – King Henry III dies; Prince Edward (at this time in Sicily) succeeds him as Edward I of England and is proclaimed king.
 Court of Common Pleas established as a permanent body, and receives its first chief justice (Gilbert of Preston).
 Worshipful Company of Cordwainers and Curriers granted rights to regulate the leather trade in the City of London; Fishmongers Company chartered.
 1273
 Edward, making a protracted return from Sicily, visits Pope Gregory X and pays homage to Philip III of France.
 1274
 2 August – Edward I returns to England from his crusade.
 19 August – coronation of Edward I at Westminster Abbey.
 August – Merton College, Oxford, receives its statutes, the first English university college to do so.
 The Hundred Rolls are commissioned, enquiring into the rights of English landowners.
 1275
 22 April – Edward I's first parliament meets and passes the first Statute of Westminster, codifying the existing law in England, in 51 chapters of Norman French, and defining legal privileges.
 May – Parliament imposes the first regular customs duty on wool and leather.
 11 September – an earthquake in southern England damages churches at Glastonbury and is felt across the country.
 Llywelyn ap Gruffudd refuses to pay homage to Edward I; Llywelyn's proxy bride Eleanor de Montfort (Edward's cousin) is captured at sea off the south-west of England and held prisoner at Windsor Castle as a bargaining counter for Llywelyn's compliance.
 Statute of the Jewry forbids Jews from charging interest on loans.
 1276
 November – Edward I invades Wales.
 Merton College, Oxford, is first recorded as having a collection of books, making its Library the world's oldest in continuous daily use.
 1277
 9 November – Treaty of Aberconwy by which Llywelyn was to retain control of Gwynedd in return for paying homage to England while Edward was to rule the remainder of Wales.
St George's Cross is first recorded in use as the national flag of England.
 1278
 June or July – Robert Burnell elected to the Archbishopric of Canterbury.
 7 August – Statute of Gloucester defines competences of local courts and establishes legal procedures for claiming a right to privileges.
 13 October – the King allows his cousin Eleanor de Montfort to marry Llywelyn ap Gruffudd at Worcester Cathedral.
 17 November – all Jews in England imprisoned on suspicion of coin clipping.
 1279
 January – Pope Nicholas III quashes the election of Robert Burnell to the Archbishopric of Canterbury.
 25 January – John Peckham enthroned as Archbishop of Canterbury against the wishes of the King.
 The first of the Statutes of Mortmain prevents land from passing into possession of the church.
 December – new coinage issued, including the first groats and round farthings and a new silver halfpenny.
 Itinerant royal judges are ordered to inquire into confederacies against justice, thus effectively making conspiracy a crime.
 The Royal Mint moves to the Tower of London by this year.
 Further round of Hundred Rolls commissioned.

Births
 1270
 Approximate date – Andrew Harclay, 1st Earl of Carlisle, military leader (executed 1323)
 1272
 April – Joan of Acre, daughter of King Edward I (died 1307)
 1273
 24 November – Alphonso, Earl of Chester, son of Edward I (died 1284)
 1274
 Approximate date – Adam Murimuth, ecclesiastic and chronicler (died 1347)
 1275
 15 March – Margaret of England, Duchess of Brabant, daughter of King Edward I (died after 1333)
 18 August – Bartholomew de Badlesmere, 1st Baron Badlesmere (died 1322)
 Approximate date – Aymer de Valence, 2nd Earl of Pembroke (died 1324)
 1276
 Humphrey de Bohun, 4th Earl of Hereford (died in battle 1322)
 1278
 11 March – Mary of Woodstock, daughter of King Edward I, nun (died by 1332)
 Approximate date – Thomas, 2nd Earl of Lancaster, politician (executed 1322)
 1279
 Approximate date – Marguerite of France, daughter of Philip III of France and Queen consort of Edward I of England (died 1318)

Deaths
 1270
 18 July – Boniface of Savoy, Archbishop of Canterbury, (born c. 1217)
 Roger Bigod, 4th Earl of Norfolk (born 1212)
 1271
 13 March – Henry of Almain, crusader (born 1235)
 Richard de Grey, Lord Warden of the Cinque Ports (year of birth unknown)
 1272
 18 March – John FitzAlan, 7th Earl of Arundel (born 1246)
 2 April – Richard, 1st Earl of Cornwall (born 1209)
 16 November – King Henry III (born 1207)
 Bartholomeus Anglicus, Franciscan friar and encyclopedia author (born before 1203)
 Approximate date – William of Sherwood, logician (born c.1200)
 1275
 26 February – Margaret of England, daughter of Henry III of England and consort of Alexander III of Scotland (born 1240)
 13 April – Eleanor of England (born 1215)
 24 September – Humphrey de Bohun, 2nd Earl of Hereford, Constable of England (born 1208)
 John of Howden, canon and poet writing in Norman French and Latin
 1277
 27 October – Walter de Merton, Lord Chancellor and founder of Merton College, Oxford (born c. 1205)
 1279
 11 September – Robert Kilwardby, Archbishop of Canterbury (born c. 1215)
 Walter Giffard, Lord Chancellor and archbishop (year of birth unknown)

References